Below is the list of populated places in Yozgat Province, Turkey by the districts. In the following lists first place in each list is the administrative center of the district.

Yozgat
Yozgat
Aktaş, Yozgat
Akyamaç, Yozgat
Alemdar, Yozgat
Aydoğan, Yozgat
Azizli, Yozgat
Azizlibağları, Yozgat
Bacılı, Yozgat
Bahçecik, Yozgat
Baltasarılar, Yozgat
Başıbüyüklü, Yozgat
Başınayayla, Yozgat
Battal, Yozgat
Bayatören, Yozgat
Beyvelioğlu, Yozgat
Bişek, Yozgat
Bozlar, Yozgat
Buzağcıoğlu, Yozgat
Büyükincirli, Yozgat
Büyükmahal, Yozgat
Büyüknefes, Yozgat
Cihanpaşa, Yozgat
Çadırardıç, Yozgat
Çağlayan, Yozgat
Çalatlı, Yozgat
Çalılı, Yozgat
Çatma, Yozgat
Çorak, Yozgat
Dağyenicesi, Yozgat
Dambasan, Yozgat
Darıcı, Yozgat
Dayılı, Yozgat
Delihasanlı, Yozgat
Derbent, Yozgat
Dereboymul, Yozgat
Derekışla, Yozgat
Deremahal, Yozgat
Deremumlu, Yozgat
Divanlı, Yozgat
Erkekli, Yozgat
Esenli, Yozgat
Evci, Yozgat
Fakıbeyli, Yozgat
Gevrek, Yozgat
Gökçekışla, Yozgat
Görpeli, Yozgat
Güdülelmahacılı, Yozgat
Güllük, Yozgat
Güllüoluk, Yozgat
Gülyayla, Yozgat
Güneşli, Yozgat
Hamzalı, Yozgat
Haydarbeyli, Yozgat
İnceçayır, Yozgat
İşleğen, Yozgat
Kababel, Yozgat
Kale, Yozgat
Karabıyık, Yozgat
Karacalar, Yozgat
Karalar, Yozgat
Kaşkışla, Yozgat
Kavurgalı, Yozgat
Kırıksoku, Yozgat
Kırım, Yozgat
Kışla, Yozgat
Kızıltepe, Yozgat
Kolanlı, Yozgat
Koyunculu, Yozgat
Köçekkömü, Yozgat
Köçeklioğlu, Yozgat
Köseyusuflu, Yozgat
Kuşcu, Yozgat
Kuyumcu, Yozgat
Lök, Yozgat
Mezraa, Yozgat
Musabeyli, Yozgat
Musabeyliboğazı, Yozgat
Osmanpaşa, Yozgat
Örencik, Yozgat
Özlüce, Yozgat
Penbecik, Yozgat
Recepli, Yozgat
Sağlık, Yozgat
Salmanfakılı, Yozgat
Sarıfatma, Yozgat
Sarıhacılı, Yozgat
Sarımbey, Yozgat
Sarınınören, Yozgat
Söğütlüyayla, Yozgat
Tayfur, Yozgat
Tayıp, Yozgat
Tekkeyenicesi, Yozgat
Topaç, Yozgat
Topcu, Yozgat
Türkmen, Yozgat
Türkmensarılar, Yozgat
Yassıhüyük, Yozgat
Yazpınar, Yozgat
Yeşilova, Yozgat
Yudan, Yozgat

Akdağmadeni
Akdağmadeni
Abdurrahmanlı, Akdağmadeni
Ağaçlı, Akdağmadeni
Akbaş, Akdağmadeni
Akçakışla, Akdağmadeni
Akçakoyunlu, Akdağmadeni
Alicik, Akdağmadeni
Altılı, Akdağmadeni
Ardıçalanı, Akdağmadeni
Arpalık, Akdağmadeni
Arslanlı, Akdağmadeni
Aşağıçulhalı, Akdağmadeni
Bahçecik, Akdağmadeni
Başçatak, Akdağmadeni
Belekçahan, Akdağmadeni
Boğazköy, Akdağmadeni
Boyalık, Akdağmadeni
Bozhüyük, Akdağmadeni
Bulgurlu, Akdağmadeni
Çağlayan, Akdağmadeni
Muşalikalesi, Akdağmadeni
Çampınar, Akdağmadeni
Çardak, Akdağmadeni
Çaypınar, Akdağmadeni
Çerçialanı, Akdağmadeni
Davulbaz, Akdağmadeni
Davutlu, Akdağmadeni
Dayılı, Akdağmadeni
Dereyurt, Akdağmadeni
Dokuz, Akdağmadeni
Dolak, Akdağmadeni
Evci, Akdağmadeni
Eynelli, Akdağmadeni
Gökdere, Akdağmadeni
Güllük, Akdağmadeni
Gümüşdibek, Akdağmadeni
Gündüzler, Akdağmadeni
Hacıfakılı, Akdağmadeni
Halhacı, Akdağmadeni
Hayran, Akdağmadeni
Hüyüklüalanı, Akdağmadeni
İbrahimağaçiftliği, Akdağmadeni
Karaalikaçağı, Akdağmadeni
Karacaören, Akdağmadeni
Karadikmen, Akdağmadeni
Karahisartatlısı, Akdağmadeni
Karapir, Akdağmadeni
Kartal, Akdağmadeni
Kayabaşı, Akdağmadeni
Kayakışla, Akdağmadeni
Kılınçlı, Akdağmadeni
Kırlar, Akdağmadeni
Kızılcaova, Akdağmadeni
Kızıldağ, Akdağmadeni
Kirsinkavağı, Akdağmadeni
Konacı, Akdağmadeni
Körük, Akdağmadeni
Kuşlukaçağı, Akdağmadeni
Melikli, Akdağmadeni
Okçulu, Akdağmadeni
Olucak, Akdağmadeni
Oluközü, Akdağmadeni
Ortaköy, Akdağmadeni
Örenkale, Akdağmadeni
Özer, Akdağmadeni
Paşabey, Akdağmadeni
Pazarcık, Akdağmadeni
Sağıroğlu, Akdağmadeni
Sarıgüney, Akdağmadeni
Sekikaşı, Akdağmadeni
Sazlıdere, Akdağmadeni
Şahnaderesi, Akdağmadeni
Tarhana, Akdağmadeni
Taspınar, Akdağmadeni
Tekkegüneyi, Akdağmadeni
Temurşeyh, Akdağmadeni
Umutlu, Akdağmadeni
Uzakçay, Akdağmadeni
Üçkaraağaç, Akdağmadeni
Veziralanı, Akdağmadeni
Yazılıtaş, Akdağmadeni
Yedişehri, Akdağmadeni
Yeniyapan, Akdağmadeni
Yukarıçulhalı, Akdağmadeni
Yünalanı, Akdağmadeni

Aydıncık
Aydıncık
Ağıllı, Aydıncık
Aşağıkuyucak, Aydıncık
Bakırboğazı, Aydıncık
Baştürk, Aydıncık
Baydiğin, Aydıncık
Benlioğlu, Aydıncık
Boğazkaya, Aydıncık
Büyüktoraman, Aydıncık
Dereçiftlik, Aydıncık
Güroğlu, Aydıncık
Hacıilyas, Aydıncık
Kazankaya, Aydıncık
Kırımoluk, Aydıncık
Kıyıkışla, Aydıncık
Kızılcakışla, Aydıncık
Kocabekir, Aydıncık
Kösrelik, Aydıncık
Kuşsaray, Aydıncık
Kuyu, Aydıncık
Küçüktoraman, Aydıncık
Mercimekören, Aydıncık
Mollaismail, Aydıncık
Sakızlık, Aydıncık
Üzümlük, Aydıncık

Boğazlıyan
Boğazlıyan
Abdilli, Boğazlıyan
Aşağıhasinli, Boğazlıyan
Aşağısarıkaya, Boğazlıyan
Bahariye, Boğazlıyan
Başhoroz, Boğazlıyan
Belören, Boğazlıyan
Çakmak, Boğazlıyan
Çalapverdi, Boğazlıyan
Dereçepni, Boğazlıyan
Devecipınar, Boğazlıyan
Eğlence, Boğazlıyan
Esentepe, Boğazlayan
Gövdecili, Boğazlıyan
Güveçli, Boğazlıyan
Karakuyu, Boğazlıyan
Müftükışla, Boğazlıyan
Oğulcuk, Boğazlıyan
Ovakent, Boğazlıyan
Ömerli, Boğazlıyan
Özler, Boğazlıyan
Poyrazlı, Boğazlıyan
Sırçalı, Boğazlıyan
Uzunlu, Boğazlıyan
Yamaçlı, Boğazlıyan
Yapalak, Boğazlıyan
Yaraş, Boğazlıyan
Yazıçepni, Boğazlıyan
Yazıkışla, Boğazlıyan
Yenikışla, Boğazlıyan
Yenipazar, Boğazlıyan
Yeşilhisar, Boğazlıyan
Yoğunhisar, Boğazlıyan

Çandır
Çandır
Büyükkışla, Çandır
Gülpınar, Çandır
İğdeli, Çandır
Kozan, Çandır

Çayıralan
Çayıralan
Alidemirci, Çayıralan
Aşağıtekke, Çayıralan
Aşağıyahyasaray, Çayıralan
Avşaralanı, Çayıralan
Curali, Çayıralan
Çokradan, Çayıralan
Derekemal, Çayıralan
Elçi, Çayıralan
Evciler, Çayıralan
Fahralı, Çayıralan
Günyayla, Çayıralan
Güzelyayla, Çayıralan
İnönü, Çayıralan
Kaletepe, Çayıralan
Karakışla, Çayıralan
Konuklar, Çayıralan
Külekçi, Çayıralan
Menteşe, Çayıralan
Söbeçimen, Çayıralan
Turluhan, Çayıralan
Yukarıtekke, Çayıralan
Yukarıyahyasaray, Çayıralan

Çekerek
Çekerek
Alıçlı, Çekerek
Arpaç, Çekerek
Başalan, Çekerek
Başpınar, Çekerek
Bayındırhüyük, Çekerek
Bazlambaç, Çekerek
Beyyurdu, Çekerek
Cemaloğlu, Çekerek
Çakır, Çekerek
Çandır, Çekerek
Çayırözü, Çekerek
Çeltek, Çekerek
Demircialan, Çekerek
Doğanoğlu, Çekerek
Ekizce, Çekerek
Elemin, Çekerek
Fakıdağı, Çekerek
Fuadiye, Çekerek
Gökdere, Çekerek
Gönülyurdu, Çekerek
Hamzalı, Çekerek
İlbeyli, Çekerek
İsaklı, Çekerek
Kahyalı, Çekerek
Kalederesi, Çekerek
Kamışcık, Çekerek
Kavakalanı, Çekerek
Kayalar, Çekerek
Kırkdilim, Çekerek
Koyunculu, Çekerek
Körpınar, Çekerek
Kurtağılı, Çekerek
Kuruçay, Çekerek
Kuzgun, Çekerek
Mehmetli, Çekerek
Ortaoba, Çekerek
Özören, Çekerek
Özükavak, Çekerek
Sarıkaya, Çekerek
Sarıköy, Çekerek
Tipideresi, Çekerek
Yukarıkarahacılı, Çekerek
Yukarıkarakaya, Çekerek
Yukarıoba, Çekerek

Kadışehri
Kadışehri
Akçakale, Kadışehri
Aşağıkızılöz, Kadışehri
Belören, Kadışehri
Buzluk, Kadışehri
Çamsaray, Kadışehri
Derbent, Kadışehri
Dikmesöğüt, Kadışehri
Elmalı, Kadışehri
Elmalıçiftliği, Kadışehri
Elmalıütüğü, Kadışehri
Gümüşsu, Kadışehri
Halıköy, Kadışehri
Hanözü, Kadışehri
Kabalı, Kadışehri
Kemalli, Kadışehri
Kıyılı, Kadışehri
Ovacık, Kadışehri
Örencik, Kadışehri
Seyhan, Kadışehri
Üçağaç, Kadışehri
Yakacık, Kadışehri
Yangı, Kadışehri
Yanık, Kadışehri
Yavuhasan, Kadışehri
Yelten, Kadışehri
Yoncalık, Kadışehri
Yukarıkızılöz, Kadışehri

Saraykent
Saraykent
Altınsu, Saraykent
Balkaya, Saraykent
Başpınar, Saraykent
Benli, Saraykent
Çiçekli, Saraykent
Çiçeklihüyüğü, Saraykent
Dedefakılı, Saraykent
İzibüyük, Saraykent
Kamberli, Saraykent
Karapınar, Saraykent
Kesikköprü, Saraykent
Kösealili, Saraykent
Ozan, Saraykent
Parmaksız, Saraykent
Sarayözü, Saraykent
Söğütlü, Saraykent

Sarıkaya
Sarıkaya
Akbenli, Sarıkaya
Akbucak, Sarıkaya
Akçadam, Sarıkaya
Alembey, Sarıkaya
Alifakılı, Sarıkaya
Arpalık, Sarıkaya
Azapbaşılı, Sarıkaya
Babayağmur, Sarıkaya
Bağlıca, Sarıkaya
Baraklı, Sarıkaya
Bebekköy, Sarıkaya
Boyalık, Sarıkaya
Burunkışla, Sarıkaya
Büyükçalağıl, Sarıkaya
Çatak, Sarıkaya
Çıkrıkçı, Sarıkaya
Çokumeşme, Sarıkaya
Deredoğan, Sarıkaya
Derekaplancı, Sarıkaya
Doğansaray, Sarıkaya
Emirbey, Sarıkaya
Erbek, Sarıkaya
Gülpınar, Sarıkaya
Gündüzlü, Sarıkaya
Hasbek, Sarıkaya
Hisarbey, Sarıkaya
Ilısu, Sarıkaya
İnevi, Sarıkaya
İnkışla, Sarıkaya
Kadıgüllü, Sarıkaya
Kadılı, Sarıkaya
Karabacak, Sarıkaya
Karacalar, Sarıkaya
Karaelli, Sarıkaya
Karahallı, Sarıkaya
Karayakup, Sarıkaya
Kargalık, Sarıkaya
Kemallı, Sarıkaya
Kerpiçcik, Sarıkaya
Koçak, Sarıkaya
Koçcağız, Sarıkaya
Konurlu, Sarıkaya
Köprücek, Sarıkaya
Küçükçalağıl, Sarıkaya
Kürkcü, Sarıkaya
Mescitli, Sarıkaya
Pınarkaya, Sarıkaya
Ramadanlı, Sarıkaya
Selimli, Sarıkaya
Söylemez, Sarıkaya
Tepedoğan, Sarıkaya
Tomarcahüyüğü, Sarıkaya
Topaktaş, Sarıkaya
Toprakpınar, Sarıkaya
Ürkütlü, Sarıkaya
Yahyalı, Sarıkaya
Yaylagül, Sarıkaya
Yazıkaplancı, Sarıkaya
Yukarısarıkaya, Sarıkaya

Sorgun
Sorgun
Ağcın, Sorgun
Ahmetfakılı, Sorgun
Akocak, Sorgun
Akoluk, Sorgun
Alcı, Sorgun
Alişar, Sorgun
Araplı, Sorgun
Aşağıcumafakılı, Sorgun
Aşağıemirler, Sorgun
Aşağıkarahacılı, Sorgun
Aşağıkarakaya, Sorgun
Ayrıdam, Sorgun
Ayvalık, Sorgun
Babalı, Sorgun
Bağlarbaşı, Sorgun
Bahadın, Sorgun
Belencumafakılı, Sorgun
Boğazcumafakılı, Sorgun
Büyükeynelli, Sorgun
Büyükkışla, Sorgun
Büyükören, Sorgun
Büyüktaşlık, Sorgun
Caferli, Sorgun
Cihanşarlı, Sorgun
Çakırhacılı, Sorgun
Çamurlu, Sorgun
Çatmasöğüt, Sorgun
Çavuşköyü, Sorgun
Çayözü, Sorgun
Çiğdemli, Sorgun
Dişli, Sorgun
Doğankent, Sorgun
Doğanlı, Sorgun
Emirhan, Sorgun
Emirler, Sorgun
Eymir, Sorgun
Faraşlı, Sorgun
Garipler, Sorgun
Gedikhasanlı, Sorgun
Gevrek, Sorgun
Gökiniş, Sorgun
Gököz, Sorgun
Gözbaba, Sorgun
Gülşehri, Sorgun
Güngören, Sorgun
Günpınar, Sorgun
Günyazı, Sorgun
Halilfakılı, Sorgun
İdrisli, Sorgun
İkikara, Sorgun
İncesu, Sorgun
İsafakılı, Sorgun
Kapaklı, Sorgun
Karabalı, Sorgun
Karaburun, Sorgun
Karakız, Sorgun
Karakocaoğlu, Sorgun
Karalık, Sorgun
Karaveli, Sorgun
Kayakışla, Sorgun
Kepirce, Sorgun
Keser, Sorgun
Kodallı, Sorgun
Kodallıçiftliği, Sorgun
Küçükeynelli, Sorgun
Küçükköhne, Sorgun
Küçüktaşlık, Sorgun
Külhüyük, Sorgun
Mansuroğlu, Sorgun
Mehmetbeyli, Sorgun
Mirahor, Sorgun
Muğallı, Sorgun
Ocaklı, Sorgun
Osmaniye, Sorgun
Peyniryemez, Sorgun
Sarıhacılı, Sorgun
Sarıhamzalı, Sorgun
Sivri, Sorgun
Şahmuratlı, Sorgun
Taşpınar, Sorgun
Temrezli, Sorgun
Tiftik, Sorgun
Tulum, Sorgun
Tuzlacık, Sorgun
Veliöldük, Sorgun
Yaycılar, Sorgun
Yaylalık, Sorgun
Yazılıtaş, Sorgun

Şefaatli
Şefaatli
Akcami, Şefaatli
Akçakoyunlu, Şefaatli
Alifakılı, Şefaatli
Arife, Şefaatli
Armağan, Şefaatli
Bağyazı, Şefaatli
Başköy, Şefaatli
Caferli, Şefaatli
Cankılı, Şefaatli
Cıcıklar, Şefaatli
Çaydoğan, Şefaatli
Dedeli, Şefaatli
Deliler, Şefaatli
Ekinciuşağı, Şefaatli
Gülistan, Şefaatli
Gülpınar, Şefaatli
Gözelli, Şefaatli
Halaçlı, Şefaatli
Hamzalı, Şefaatli
Hüyükkışla, Şefaatli
İbrahimhacılı, Şefaatli
Kabacaoğlu, Şefaatli
Kabakini, Şefaatli
Karakaya, Şefaatli
Karalar, Şefaatli
Kaykılı, Şefaatli
Kazlıuşağı, Şefaatli
Kızılkoca, Şefaatli
Kızılyar, Şefaatli
Koçköy, Şefaatli
Konaklı, Şefaatli
Kumkuyu, Şefaatli
Kuzayca, Şefaatli
Küçükincirli, Şefaatli
Paşaköy, Şefaatli
Saatli, Şefaatli
Saçlı, Sefaatli
Sarıkent, Şefaatli
Şerefoğlu, Şefaatli
Tahiroğlu, Şefaatli
Temlik, Şefaatli
Türüdüler, Şefaatli
Yıldızköy, Şefaatli

Yenifakılı
Yenifakılı
Başpınar, Yenifakılı
Bektaşlı, Yenifakılı
Çöplüçiftliği, Yenifakılı
Eskiören, Yenifakılı
Fehimli, Yenifakılı
Üçobalar, Yenifakılı
Yiğitler, Yenifakılı

Yerköy
Yerköy
Akpınar, Yerköy
Arifeoğlu, Yerköy
Arslanhacılı, Yerköy
Aşağıeğerci, Yerköy
Aşağıelmahacılı, Yerköy
Aydıngün, Yerköy
Belkavak, Yerköy
Beserek, Yerköy
Bicikler, Yerköy
Buruncuk, Yerköy
Cakcak, Yerköy
Çakırhacılı, Yerköy
Çakırlar, Yerköy
Çalıklı, Yerköy
Çamdibi, Yerköy
Çamlıbel, Yerköy
Çayköy, Yerköy
Delice, Yerköy
Derebağı, Yerköy
Derecik, Yerköy
Göçerli, Yerköy
Gündoğdu, Yerköy
Hacıçeşmesi, Yerköy
Hacılı, Yerköy
Hacımusalı, Yerköy
Hacıosmanlı, Yerköy
Hacıuşağı, Yerköy
Hatip, Yerköy
Kahyaköy, Yerköy
Karacaağaç, Yerköy
Karacaahmetli, Yerköy
Karaosmanoğlu, Yerköy
Karlı, Yerköy
Kayadibi, Yerköy
Kocaoğlu, Yerköy
Kömüşören, Yerköy
Kördeve, Yerköy
Köycü, Yerköy
Kumluca, Yerköy
Küçükçalıklı, Yerköy
Küçüknefes, Yerköy
Orhan, Yerköy
Poyraz, Yerköy
Salihli, Yerköy
Saray, Yerköy
Sarıyaprak, Yerköy
Sedir, Yerköy
Sekili, Yerköy
Susuz, Yerköy
Süleymanlı, Yerköy
Terzili, Yerköy
Topaç, Yerköy
Yakuplu, Yerköy
Yerköy, Yerköy
Yukarıeğerci, Yerköy
Yukarıelmahacılı, Yerköy
Yukarıihsangazili, Yerköy
Zencir, Yerköy

References

List
Yozgat